Marco Bracci (born August 23, 1966 in Fucecchio, province of Florence) is a former Italian volleyball player, ranked amongst the world's most valuable players of the late 1980s and 1990s. A 197 cm athlete, Bracci played as passer-hitter.

Bracci made his debut for the Italy national team on May 6, 1988. He earned 344 caps for his native country, winning three Volleyball World Championships (1990, 1994 and 1998) and four Volleyball European Championships (1989, 1993, 1995 and 1999), plus numerous other titles. One of the most winning players of all-time in the Italian Championships, his club titles include six scudetti and four European Champions Cups.

He played at four Olympic Games, winning  a silver medal at the 1996 Games and a bronze medal at the 2000 Olympics.

He has worked as assistant coach of Massimo Barbolini the trainer of Italy women's national volleyball team

Clubs

References

1966 births
Living people
People from Fucecchio
Italian men's volleyball players
Olympic volleyball players of Italy
Olympic silver medalists for Italy
Olympic bronze medalists for Italy
Volleyball players at the 1988 Summer Olympics
Volleyball players at the 1992 Summer Olympics
Volleyball players at the 1996 Summer Olympics
Volleyball players at the 2000 Summer Olympics
Olympic medalists in volleyball
Medalists at the 2000 Summer Olympics
Medalists at the 1996 Summer Olympics
Competitors at the 1990 Goodwill Games
Goodwill Games medalists in volleyball
Competitors at the 1991 Mediterranean Games
Mediterranean Games gold medalists for Italy
Mediterranean Games medalists in volleyball
Sportspeople from the Metropolitan City of Florence
20th-century Italian people